Brian Manning is a Trinidad and Tobago politician representing the People's National Movement (PNM). He has served as a Member of Parliament in the House of Representatives for San Fernando East since the 2020 general election. He is the current Minister in the Ministry of Finance.

Early life 
Manning is the eldest son of Patrick Manning, former Prime Minister for Trinidad and Tobago, and Hazel Manning, former Minister of Education and Minister of Local Government. He has one brother, David. He lived in Marabella for several years growing up.

He received a bachelors' of art in economics and a bachelors' of science in information systems management from the University of Maryland, College Park. He also obtained a masters' of science in finance and asset management from the University of Maryland and a masters' of business administration in international business and marketing from the University of Miami. He received a certificate in advanced business Spanish from the Venezuelan embassy in Trinidad and Tobago.

Career 
Manning was previously a business analyst at Massy Energy Services Ltd and an investment banker at RBC Caribbean. He also worked as a small, medium enterprise financing officer at the Inter-American Development Bank in Washington, D.C., where he focused on businesses in the Caribbean and Central America. He founded Shining World Consultancy Ltd in 2006 and acted as executive director. He has held the position of equity analyst at the University of Maryland’s Robert H. Smith School Global Equity Fund and served as editor of the Business Guardian for six months.

Political career 
He contested the constituency of San Fernando East in the 2020 general election, the seat that his father held from 1971 to 2015. He was nominated by the People's National Movement screening committee in May 2020, receiving 14 of 24 votes from the party's executive and beating the incumbent MP, Randall Mitchell, for the nomination. He pinpointed youth unemployment and aging infrastructure as two areas of focus within the district. He ran against Monifa Russell Andrews from the United National Congress.

He was appointed as a Minister in the Ministry of Finance on 19 August 2020.

Personal life 
Manning married Shelly Dass, a former media executive, at Stollmeyer's Castle in Port of Spain on 12 December 2020. He served as president of the Trinidad and Tobago Basketball Federation in 2008.

References 

Living people
Year of birth missing (living people)
Members of the House of Representatives (Trinidad and Tobago)
People's National Movement politicians
University of Maryland, College Park alumni
University of Miami alumni
21st-century Trinidad and Tobago politicians